Michael Vey: Rise of the Elgen is the second book by Richard Paul Evans in the heptalogy of Michael Vey series. It carries on where the first book (Michael Vey: Prisoner of Cell 25) left off in search for Michael's mother.

Plot 

After forcing Hatch to flee the Elgen Academy in Pasadena, the Electroclan, led by Michael, escapes back to Idaho where Elgen guards are waiting to recapture them. When they try to hide out at Jack's house, they see it was burned down by the Elgen. When they arrive at Jack's sister's tanning salon, they are forced to escape on a tip from a voice on a strange phone, who claims that the police (now controlled by the Elgen) are on their way to arrest them. The unidentified voice orders them to stay at a safe house that he owns. There, they use Grace, a "human flash drive", who has downloaded Elgen files before they were destroyed.
 
After Ostin goes through the files, they reveal that Michael's mother is being held captive at an Elgen-owned power plant in Peru. The Electroclan learns that the Elgen owns hundreds of renewable energy power plants in different countries powered by rats that were tested on by the MEI. Michael and the Electroclan are alarmed that the Elgen has already taken over the countries they've built "Starxource" plants in. After this revelation, the Elgen guards burst into the house and take the Glows hostage. Eventually, after a high-speed car chase, the Electroclan realizes that the voice is the only one who can help. The group stays at Jack's friend Mitchell's house and they evade the police and Elgen looking for them. Michael negotiates with the voice and sends Grace to stay with the organization that the voice leads, in exchange for a trip to Peru. After they enhance their powers, they fly out to Peru, where the voice sends the group a guide, Jaime, to lead them through the Amazon to the Peruvian plant. 
 
Meanwhile, Hatch is forced by Elgen Inc.'s board of directors to shut down the Starxource Program in favor for global profits, not global control of the world. Hatch announces this to his own Glows, Tara (Taylor's twin), Quentin, Bryan, Kylee, and Torstyn, and they react with shock. Hatch reveals that he will disobey the board's plans and is headed out to the Peruvian Starxource Plant in Puerto Maldonado, to gather up at least two thousand guardsmen who are loyal to them. He gives the Glows a tour of the power plant, including the Bowl, where the Elgen feed the rats. At a convention for the guards, Hatch announces they will soon take over the Elgen Corporation, and then, eventually, the world.
 
The Electroclan arrives in Peru, and is guided through the jungle by Jaime. When they appear at the Starxource Plant, the group dresses as Elgen guards and sneaks into the plant. After being cornered in a room inside the plant, Hatch sends the rats to feed the group to, but Zeus boldly sacrifices himself by turning on the building's sprinklers. Jack fights his way through the sea of rats to save Zeus who, if makes contact with water, will self-electrocute himself. They find Michael's mother in a cell, having been terrorized by Hatch. After the group rescues her and another Glow named Tanner who betrayed Dr. Hatch, Michael stays behind to allow the others to escape (the tunnel can only be closed from the outside). Hatch catches Michael and unsuccessfully tries to return him to the Elgen's side. He then sends the loyal Glows into Michael's cell to try to convince him to join them which also fails. Michael taunts Torstyn, the most dangerous and malevolent of the Glows. It looks like he is going to fight Michael though stops because he is afraid of what Dr. Hatch will do to him if he does. Michael then reveals that the reason Dr. Hatch has so many guards is because he fears them. Hatch demands that the children leave, and Michael is put into the room filled with the millions of electric rats. 
 
Fortunately, Michael absorbs the rats' electricity, generating so much force that many of the rats are decimated. Outside the plant, Ostin and the rest of the group summarize that blowing up the water pumping facility will free Michael; the water pumping building helps cool down the Bowl when the rats are gathered up inside it, therefore preventing a potential meltdown of the plant. The Electroclan detonates the facility, and the remaining rats in the Bowl are killed, as they cannot withstand each other's heat. This effectively shuts down the plant and the country's energy supply. 
 
Michael then flees into the Amazon jungle to meet up with the Electroclan. He loses his way in the jungle and is nearly killed by Elgen helicopters, but Tanner takes the crafts down. Michael continues on his way, ignorant of where he is. He finally stumbles across a native tribe who tell him that he cannot go home.

Sequel 
The sequel to this book, Michael Vey: Battle of the Ampere, was published September 17, 2013.

Characters

Electroclan Members 
 Michael Vey
 Taylor Ridley
 Ostin Liss  
 Jack Vranes 
 Wade West  
 Leonard Frank "Zeus"
 Ian  
 McKenna
 Abigail
 Grace
 Tanner (after they save him)
 The Voice ( The helper )
 Jaime ( helper and friend of the Voice )

The Elgen
 Dr. C. James "Jim" Hatch
 E.G.G. Welch (Hatch's right hand man)
 Tara
 Quentin
 Torstyn
 Bryan
 Kylee

Secondary Characters
 Board Members
 Sharon Vey (Michael's Mother)
 Mitchell

Bibliography 
 Evans, Richard Paul. Michael Vey : Rise of the Elgen, New York :Mercury Ink/Simon Pulse, 2012. Print.

References

External links 
 Michael Vey Official Site

2012 American novels
2012 science fiction novels
American science fiction novels
American young adult novels
Rise of the Elgen, Michael Vay
Sequel novels
Superhero novels